Francis Coventry (1725–1759) was an English cleric and novelist, best known for The History of Pompey the Little.

Life
A native of Cambridgeshire, he was educated at Magdalene College, Cambridge, where he proceeded B.A. 1748 and M.A. 1752. He was appointed by his kinsman the Earl of Coventry to the perpetual curacy of Edgware, and died of smallpox at Whitchurch.

Works

Coventry was the author of:

Penshurst, a poem, inscribed to William Perry, esq., and the Hon. Mrs. Elizabeth Perry, 1750, reprinted in vol. iv. of Dodsley's Miscellanies; 
the fifteenth number of the World, 12 April 1753, containing Strictures on the Absurd Novelties introduced in Gardening; 
the satirical romance and roman à clef, Pompey the Little, or the Adventures of a Lapdog, 1751 (5th ed. 1773), which Lady Mary Wortley Montagu preferred to Peregrine Pickle. Several characters in were intended for ladies well known in contemporary society.

Notes

Attribution

External links

 Francis Coventry at the Eighteenth-Century Poetry Archive (ECPA)
 
 

1725 births
1759 deaths
18th-century English Anglican priests
18th-century English male writers
18th-century English novelists
English male novelists